Valbjarnarvöllur, also known as Eimskipsvöllurinn  for sponsorship reasons, is a football stadium in Reykjavík, Iceland.  It is the home stadium of Þróttur Reykjavík who play in the Úrvalsdeild. The stadium has a capacity of 5,478 fans.

In December 2016, Þróttur Reykjavík announced a three-year sponsorship deal with local shipping company Eimskip until 2019, which would see the stadium name changed to Eimskipsvöllurinn for the duration of the deal.

References

External links
Stadium information at Soccerway

Football venues in Iceland
Sports venues in Reykjavík